Steven Rue Adams (born January 16, 1975) is a California-based American bassist and co-founder of San Francisco rock/pop/jam band Animal Liberation Orchestra (ALO) and current bassist for Nicki Bluhm & The Gramblers. In addition to his work with ALO, Steve has toured and recorded with many other musicians.  Recording credits include Jack Johnson, Tim Bluhm, Nicki Bluhm, Zach Gill, Forest Sun, John Craigie and Big Light. Touring credits include Brett Dennen, Sara Bareilles, Tea Leaf Green, Laurie Lewis and Matt Costa.

Biography

Early years
Steve was born in San Jose, and has been in California most of his life. He lived in Germany for a couple years where his little brother was born. By age 5, his family had settled in Saratoga, California. Steve and his two brothers and one sister all studied music growing up.  His older sister studied piano and his older brother, the baritone horn. Steve took piano lessons off and on from age 5 and up. He also joined the school string orchestra in 5th grade playing violin, and played alto saxophone in the school concert band in 6th and 7th grades.

By the end of 7th grade, Steve had met up with future ALO bandmates Zach Gill and Dan Lebowitz to form their first rock band, One Percent Away.  Steve bought a short-scale electric bass guitar and started lessons at the local guitar store, Torres Guitars, as well as taking notes from Gill's dad.  The band changed their name to Django in high school and recorded their first album during their senior year, entitled Contact.

College years
Steve and his bandmates left for Santa Barbara, California after graduating high school to pursue degrees in music.  After wavering between different studies within the UCSB Music Department, Steve took his last couple years of college to focus on a degree in ethnomusicology, writing his final thesis on the origin and evolution of Mariachi music from Mexico.  Steve was also very active in the Jazz and Middle Eastern Music Ensembles.  In the middle of college, Django picked up drummer Dave Brogan during the Summer of 1996, just before folding the project altogether.  Following Django, Steve and bandmates Gill and Lebowitz continued creating new bands, including Magnum Family, I.V. Dogs, The LAG Acoustic Buffet and eventually, in their last year at UCSB, The Animal Liberation Orchestra & The Free Range Horns.

After graduating from UCSB, Steve went on tour with Gill, Lebowitz and high school friend Rob Binkley, driving around the U.S. playing coffee shops, bars, small clubs and street corners, under the name The BLAG Buffet. On this trip, Steve was gifted his grandfather's Vega Artist banjo upon a pitstop/visit in Billings, MT. Upon his return to CA, Steve resettled back in his hometown of Saratoga for a few months, just before moving to San Francisco, California, which would be his home for the next 6 years.

San Francisco years
In San Francisco, Steve worked restaurant jobs and eventually picked up a full-time job at a design firm where he learned print and web design skills that would later apply to a number of years as a freelance designer. Steve continued playing with ALO while in SF, with the addition of Shree Shyam Das on drums, who became a close friend and musical collaborator. Steve also picked up many gigs within the local scene, playing local clubs as well as private events for the booming dot-com businesses in the Bay Area. Through an outreach from Gill's keyboard repair technician, Steve ended up joining a bluegrass outfit called Philboyd Studge, playing string bass and singing occasional lead vocals.  He also filled in occasionally with college friends who had also relocated to SF, The Court & Spark, as well as lending string bass to several of their studio recordings.  During a break with ALO, Steve and Lebowitz did some Winter touring with the group Global Funk Council, a spin-off of Karl Denson's Tiny Universe.

ALO reunited in the Spring of 2002 with college bandmate Dave Brogan on drums, and has been touring the globe and recording steadily ever since.  Through their college friendship with surfer/singer/songwriter Jack Johnson, Steve has also become part of the Brushfire Records family with ALO signing a record contract with the label in 2005.  Steve has not only recorded three full-length records with ALO for Brushfire, but also appeared on several label compilations such as A Brokedown Melody and Thank You... Goodnight.  With occasional breaks and an ongoing interest to promote side-projects from within the band, Steve has additionally toured with Brett Dennen, whom he met at the High Sierra Music Festival.  While on tour with Dennen, Steve also met support act Sara Bareilles which later resulted in some Winter touring in her band as well.  Through the Bay Area jamband scene connection and from a long-time friendship with keyboardist Trevor Garrod who also graduated from Saratoga High, Steve has also done substantial touring with San Francisco rockers, Tea Leaf Green, filling in for their permanent bassist, Reed Mathis.

Steve joined San Francisco country/soul/rock band Nicki Bluhm & The Gramblers in 2009 and has been their main touring and recording bass player since.

Present
Currently, Steve resides in Oakland, California where he has been since 2006, and tours with both ALO and Nicki Bluhm & The Gramblers.

Discography
With Animal Liberation Orchestra

With Other Artists

References

External links
 Official website
 Interview with Music In Schools Today

1975 births
Living people
21st-century American bass guitarists
21st-century American double-bassists
20th-century American bass guitarists
20th-century American double-bassists
American rock bass guitarists
American rock double-bassists
20th-century American keyboardists
21st-century American keyboardists
American rock keyboardists